KTA may refer to:
 Kansas Turnpike, US
 Kansas Turnpike Authority
 Karratha Airport, Western Australia
 Kokoda Track Authority, managers of the WWII Kokoda Track in PNG
 Korea Taekwondo Association
 KTA Super Stores, Hawaii